Celebrity Wrestling is a British television programme, broadcast on ITV in 2005. It involved two teams of celebrities, competing against each other in wrestling style events. The series was presented by Kate Thornton and Rowdy Roddy Piper. British mixed martial arts fighter Ian Freeman was the show's referee.

The aftershow programme on ITV2, called Celebrity Wrestling: Bring It On was presented by Jack Osbourne and Holly Willoughby. The winning team was The Warriors and the winning wrestlers were Annabel Croft (Solitaire) and Iwan Thomas (The Dragon).

After five weeks the show was moved from its primetime Saturday evening slot to a graveyard Sunday morning slot due to its extremely poor ratings and being comprehensively beaten in audience share by Doctor Who on BBC One.

It was received with a feeling of derision by professional wrestling fans, due to the lack of actual wrestling content. The show featured heavily upon games which involved grappling and the real life interactions of team members in training (and usually not the training process itself). After suffering in the ratings against Doctor Who on BBC One, Celebrity Wrestling was burned off in a Sunday morning timeslot, and later cancelled.

Teams
Bold indicates that the celebrity won their gender championship

Crusaders
This team was trained by wrestler D'Lo Brown

Warriors
This team was trained by wrestler Joe Legend

Masked Celebrity
Each week there was a "mystery celebrity" who joined in the wrestling. The celebrities included:
Fatima Whitbread
John Fashanu
Neil Ruddock
Antonia Okonma
Terri Dwyer
Fran Cosgrave

Other participants
Model Emma B took part in one episode as a replacement for Victoria Silvstedt using the character name Queen Bee.
Radio DJ Toby Anstis was set to appear in the series, but had to pull out when he broke two of his fingers.
The UK Pitbulls tag team appeared on the follow-up show with Jack Osbourne, but serious wrestlers declined to appear.

See also
List of professional wrestling television series

References

External links

2005 British television series debuts
2005 British television series endings
British reality television series
ITV game shows
Television series by ITV Studios
Professional wrestling television series